Gašper Švab (born 18 July 1986 in Kranj) is a Slovenian former cyclist. He rode for the  his whole career.

Major results
Source:

2007
 2nd U23 National Road Race Championships
 3rd Overall Giro delle Regioni
 3rd Overall Grand Prix du Portugal
2008
 1st  U23 National Road Race Championships
 3rd Overall Gemenc Grand Prix
1st Stage 2
2009
 1st GP Kranj
 4th Gran Premio San Giuseppe
 5th Overall Tour de Slovénie
 5th Overall The Paths of King Nikola
2010
 8th Overall Tour de Slovénie

References

External links
 

1986 births
Living people
Slovenian male cyclists